This is a list of academic journals pertaining to the field of psychotherapy.

 American Journal of Psychotherapy
 Clinical Social Work Journal
 Journal of Cognitive Psychotherapy
 Journal of Consulting and Clinical Psychology
 Psychotherapy
 Psychotherapy Research
 Psychotherapy and Psychosomatics

Psychoanalysis 
 The American Journal of Psychoanalysis
 Contemporary Psychoanalysis
 Hurly-Burly, The International Lacanian Journal of Psychoanalysis
 The International Journal of Psychoanalysis
 International Journal of Psychoanalytic Psychotherapy
 Journal of the American Psychoanalytic Association

Psychotheraphy
Psychotherapy j